Albert Fearnley (10 March 1924 – 4 May 1999) was an English rugby league footballer who played in the 1950s, and coached in the 1960s and 1950s. After retiring as a player, he coached at club level for Halifax, Bradford Northern, Batley, and Blackpool Borough.

Background
Albert Fearnley was born in Bradford, West Riding of Yorkshire, England.

Playing career

Challenge Cup Final appearances
Albert Fearnley played right-, i.e. number 12, in Halifax's 4–8 defeat by Warrington in the 1954 Challenge Cup Final replay during the 1953–54 season at Odsal Stadium, Bradford on Wednesday 5 May 1954, in front of a record crowd of 102,575 or more.

Coaching career

Championship final appearances
Albert Fearnley was the coach in Halifax's 15–7 victory over St. Helens in the 1964–65 Championship Final during the 1964–65 season at Station Road, Swinton on Saturday 22 May 1965.

Club career
Albert Fearnley was the coach of Batley from June 1977 to October 1977.

Personal life
Fearnley had two sons and one daughter. His elder son, Stan, played for Bradford Northern while Albert was general manager at the club, and also went on to play for Leeds. His other son, Gordon, was a professional footballer who played for Sheffield Wednesday, Bristol Rovers and Fort Lauderdale Strikers.

References

External links
Search for "Fearnley" at rugbyleagueproject.org

1924 births
1999 deaths
Batley Bulldogs coaches
Batley Bulldogs players
Blackpool Borough coaches
Bradford Bulls coaches
English rugby league coaches
English rugby league players
Featherstone Rovers players
Halifax R.L.F.C. coaches
Halifax R.L.F.C. players
Keighley Cougars coaches
Oldham R.L.F.C. players
Rochdale Hornets players
Rugby league players from Bradford
Rugby league second-rows
Rugby articles needing expert attention